Jan Caliński (November 21, 1948 – July 5, 2021) was a Polish football manager.

References

1948 births
2021 deaths
Polish footballers
Polish football managers
Śląsk Wrocław managers
Górnik Wałbrzych (football) managers
Association footballers not categorized by position